Bharatpur Assembly constituency may refer to 
 Bharatpur, Rajasthan Assembly constituency
 Bharatpur, West Bengal Assembly constituency